The men's K-1 5000 metres canoe sprint competition at the 2015 European Games in Baku took place on 16 June at the Kur Sport and Rowing Centre in Mingachevir.

Schedule
The schedule was as follows:

All times are Azerbaijan Summer Time (UTC+5)

Results
As a long-distance event, it was held as a direct final.

References

Men's K-1 5000 metres